This article details the 2015 Santosh Trophy qualifiers.

Format
Qualifiers will start from 10 January to 23 January 2015 and will consist of 33 teams. Top 2 teams from each zone will make it to the final round.

East Zone

Group A

Group B

North Zone

Group A

Group B

North East Zone

Group A

Group B

South Zone

Group A

Group B

West Zone

References

External links

San